R. Duane Ireland is an American management professor, author, and a former interim dean of Mays Business School at Texas A&M University. Prior to his appointment as interim dean, Ireland served as acting dean of the school from January 1, 2021 – June 13, 2021.

Education 

Ireland earned his Ph.D. (1977), MBA (1971), and Bachelor of Business Administration (1969) from Texas Tech University, where he was named a Distinguished Alumnus (2018) of the Rawls College of Business. He also earned an Associate in Science degree from Amarillo Junior College (1967).

Career 

On January 1, 2021, he was appointed acting dean of Mays Business School and then interim dean on June 14, 2021. Ireland replaced Dr. Eli Jones who, after serving as dean for six years, returned to the faculty in the Department of Marketing as a full professor and holder of an endowed chair.

Ireland and his family – including his wife Mary Ann and their two adult children – have endowed a $50,000 scholarship to Mays Business School.

Publications 

Ireland has authored or co-authored more than 20 books. His recent publications include two books: Strategic Management: Competitiveness and Globalization, 13th Edition (2020), Cengage Publishing, and Entrepreneurship: Successfully Launching New Ventures, 6th Edition (2019), Pearson Publishing.

Ireland has also published  articles in journals such as the ''Academy of Management Journal and the Journal of Management.

Awards 

Ireland has been included on four separate occasions in the Economics and Business section of the list of “The Most Highly Cited Researchers’ List” (compiled by Clarivate Analytics). He has received several awards including the 2017 Academy of Management Career Achievement Award for Distinguished Service, the 2017 Lifetime Achievement Award for Research and Scholarship given by Mays Business School, and in 2012, The Association of Former Students Distinguished Achievement Award for Research from Texas A&M University. In 2017, he was the inaugural recipient of the Distinguished Service Award from the Strategic Management Division of the Academy of Management. In 2018, he received recognition as a Distinguished Alumnus of the Rawls College of Business at Texas Tech University.

References 

Living people
Texas Tech University alumni
Texas A&M University faculty
Business school deans
Year of birth missing (living people)